Betty Stöve and Wendy Turnbull were the defending champions but they competed with different partners that year, Stöve with Pam Shriver and Turnbull with Rosemary Casals.

Casals and Turnbull lost in the quarterfinals to Andrea Jaeger and Regina Maršíková.

Shriver and Stöve lost in the final 7–6(7–2), 7–5 in the final against Billie Jean King and Martina Navratilova.

Seeds 
Champion seeds are indicated in bold text while text in italics indicates the round in which those seeds were eliminated. Five seeded teams (and eleven non-seeded teams) received byes into the second round.

Draw

Finals

Top half

Section 1

Section 2

Bottom half

Section 3

Section 4

External links 
 1980 WTA US Open Women's Doubles Draw
1980 US Open – Women's draws and results at the International Tennis Federation

Women's Doubles
US Open (tennis) by year – Women's doubles
1980 in women's tennis
1980 in American women's sports